Octopus pallidus, the pale octopus, is a species of octopus in Oceania.

Immediately after hatching, the pale octopus forages, primarily on bivalves. At night it hides in rubble to surprise prey. Female maturation is dependent on age as well as season. Both sexes can distinguish vertical from horizontal rectangles, and gradient greys from each other and uniform grey.

This species has been studied by scientists trying to determine octopus ages by stylets and pigment.

Gallery

References 

 Norman M.D. & Hochberg F.G. (2005) The current state of Octopus taxonomy. Phuket Marine Biological Center Research Bulletin 66:127–154
 Norman M.D., Finn J.K. & Hochberg F.G. (2014). Family Octopodidae. pp. 36–215, in P. Jereb, C.F.E. Roper, M.D. Norman & J.K. Finn eds. Cephalopods of the world. An annotated and illustrated catalogue of cephalopod species known to date. Volume 3. Octopods and Vampire Squids. FAO Species Catalogue for Fishery Purposes [Rome, FAO]. 4(3): 353 pp. 11 pls.

Molluscs described in 1885
Octopodidae